The London Socialist Alliance (LSA)  was an alliance of socialist groups and individuals in London. It stood candidates for the Greater London Assembly Election in 2000, but supported Ken Livingstone in the mayoral elections held at the same time. It became part of the Socialist Alliance after the elections.

At the assembly elections it polled about 27,000 votes from a total of 2,400,000, and got 1.6% of the vote.

External links

Defunct socialist parties in the United Kingdom
Political parties established in 2000
Socialist parties in England
Political history of London
Defunct political party alliances in the United Kingdom
2000 establishments in England